Lugonzo Ligamy (born July 29, 1992) is a Kenyan rugby sevens player. He was selected for 's 2016 Summer Olympics squad. He was part of the team that won the 2016 Singapore Sevens.

References

External links 
 

1992 births
Living people
Rugby sevens players at the 2016 Summer Olympics
Olympic rugby sevens players of Kenya
Kenya international rugby sevens players
Male rugby sevens players
Kenyan rugby union players